Patrick Reynolds, professionally known as Plain Pat, is an American music executive, record producer, songwriter and disc jockey (DJ). He is perhaps best known for overseeing American musicians Kanye West and Kid Cudi, during their respective early vocations. He is also noted for working with prominent artists such as Drake, Alicia Keys, Mary J. Blige, Lupe Fiasco,  Ghostface Killah, The Roots, Lloyd, Young Gunz, Ashanti, Ludacris, Freeway, Ja Rule, N.O.R.E. and The Mutton Birds among others.

Plain Pat is credited with working on several high-profile albums. He has produced on albums such as Thank Me Later, Element of Freedom, Stronger with Each Tear, 808's and Heartbreak, Man on the Moon II: The Legend of Mr. Rager, Man on the Moon: The End of Day, A Kid Named Cudi, Graduation, The Life of Pablo and more. He has also served as an A&R on the following albums More Fish, Game Theory, Fishscale, The College Dropout, Southside, Tough Luv, Fefe Dobson, Ashanti's Christmas, Chicken-N-Beer, Chapter II, Philadelphia Freeway, Last Temptation, God's Favorite, Tical 0: The Prequel and Flock: The Best of the Mutton Birds.

Career and ventures
In 2007, Plain Pat mixed and hosted Kanye West's mixtape Can't Tell Me Nothing. In 2007, Pat, alongside fellow American music producer Emile Haynie, began co-managing up-and-coming musician Kid Cudi. In 2008, Plain Pat and Haynie produced Kid Cudi’s breakout mixtape A Kid Named Cudi. In 2009, Plain Pat, Haynie and Cudi, launched their record label imprint, Dream On, in partnership with Kanye West's GOOD Music and Universal Motown. Cudi announced in February 2011 however, that the label had been dissolved. Cudi stated to Complex magazine that they were still on good terms: "I wanted to try something new, and I wanted to take control of things myself.[...] There’s no hard feelings." The label released Kid Cudi's albums, Man on the Moon: The End of Day (2009) and Man on the Moon II: The Legend of Mr. Rager (2010). 
In 2010, Plain Pat also worked on My Beautiful Dark Twisted Fantasy with Kanye West.
In 2015, Plain Pat and Kid Cudi reunited  with Speedin' Bullet 2 Heaven. Plain Pat also contributed to Kanye West's The Life of Pablo in 2016, as well as the Kid Cudi and Kanye West collaborative project Kids See Ghosts in 2018.

Legacy
Plain Pat is one of the most well-respected producers of all time. Despite having produced a large number of hit records for many top-tier artists, Plain Pat has always kept himself away from the limelight and maintains a very private life.

In a 2021 interview, American producer Dot da Genius spoke on Plain Pat: “I just have to go on record and say Plain Pat is a very elusive, mythical figure in our industry. He's done so many legendary things and his taste level... You want to get Plain Pat to like your music, because then you know you got something.”

In February 2022, Kanye West posted a photo of Plain Pat on his Instagram, and captioned it: "Even though we didn’t see this person in the doc Plain Pat is one the most important people in my career. He was the first person who worked at Def Jam who not only saw my potential but invested his time to ensure our success. He also discovered Kid Cudi and he invented drums like Swagger like us and the game changing bleep snare on Say You Will. This person has never lied to me and is the least industry person I know. He has never clouted up. If you can count your real friends on one hand I only have 4 fingers left."

Discography

Soundtrack albums

Filmography
 A Man Named Scott (2021) - Himself

References

External links
 
 
 Patrick "Plain Pat" Reynolds at Artistdirect
 
 

American hip hop record producers
Living people
Date of birth missing (living people)
American music managers
American talent agents
American male songwriters
American music people
American music industry executives
1983 births
American hip hop DJs
American male film score composers